HBO Comedy Half-Hour is a stand-up comedy television series of specials by various comedians, usually live from The Fillmore in San Francisco, with the format of a single comedian presenting a routine for thirty minutes.

The series ran on HBO from 1994 to 1999.  Comedians who appeared on the show include Louis C.K., Janeane Garofalo, Chris Rock, Dave Chappelle, Dave Attell, Gilbert Gottfried, Bobcat Goldthwait, Patton Oswalt, Norm Macdonald, Margaret Cho, Laura Kightlinger, David Cross, Steve Harvey, and many others.

Episode listing

Season 1 (1994)

Season 2 (1995)

Season 3 (1996)

Season 4 (1997)

References

External links

HBO original programming
1994 American television series debuts
1999 American television series endings
1990s American stand-up comedy television series
English-language television shows
Television series by Home Box Office